Lotos Kolej sp. z o.o. is a Polish rail company operating as a part of Grupa Lotos JSC. Lotos Kolej is responsible for transporting Lotos Group products and delivering petrol for Rafineria Gdańska.

The company precedesor, Zakład Transportu Kolejowego Rafinerii Gdańskiej operated since 20 March 2002.
Since 2003 the company has the license to transport petrol along all PKP PLK lines and is operating outside the Tricity, operating refineries in Czechowice-Dziedzice, Jasło and Gorlice.

Rails and rolling stock
The company manages over 80 km of track on the refinery's property.  The main locomotives used by the company are ST43, SM42 and SM48. Lotos Kolej uses many different kinds of oil tankers for transporting products of the Lotos Group.

See also 
 Transportation in Poland
 List of railway companies
 Polish locomotives designation

References 
 Companies official website, URL accessed 2 March 2006
  

Railway companies of Poland
Polish Limited Liability Companies